Fincham is a surname. Notable people with the surname include:

George Fincham (1828–1910), British organ builder
Gordon Fincham (1935–2012), British footballer
Joe Fincham (born 1964), American football coach and former player
John Fincham (1926–2005), British geneticist 
Paul Fincham (born 1959), British composer
Peter Fincham (born 1956), British television producer and executive